Gateshead Football Club is a professional football club based in Gateshead, England.

Established in 1977 after Gateshead United folded, the club are known as the "Tynesiders" or the "Heed". There had been a Gateshead A.F.C. in the English Football League from 1930 to 1960, which had itself folded before Gateshead United had been established. The current incarnation of the club began life in the Northern Premier League, winning Premier Division titles in the 1982–83 and 1985–86 seasons. However they were relegated out of the Conference in 1984 and 1987. They secured promotion back into the Conference at the end of the 1989–90 season, though would remain there only until another relegation in 1998. The club were further relegated out of the Northern Premier League Premier Division in 2003. They won the First Division play-offs in 2004 and the Premier Division play-offs in 2008, before winning promotion out of the Conference North with a second-placed finish in 2008–09. Gateshead spent the next decade in the top-flight of English football's non-League system, losing a play-off final in 2014, before they were demoted into the National League North in 2019 due to financial irregularities. They returned to the National League after winning the National League North in 2021–22.

History
The original Gateshead club was formed in 1899 as South Shields Adelaide and became members of the Football League in 1919. In 1930 financial problems saw the club moved to Gateshead, where they adopted the name of their new town. However, the club was voted out of the Football League in 1960 and folded in 1973. History repeated itself as the South Shields club formed to replace the original one was also moved to Gateshead, becoming Gateshead United in 1974. However, they were dissolved at the end of the 1976–77 season. A new club was established, taking over from United in the Northern Premier League. After three seasons in the bottom half of the table, they finished eleventh in 1980–81, also reaching the first round of the FA Cup for the first time, losing 1–0 at Lincoln City. The club finished fourth in the league the following season.

The 1982–83 season saw Gateshead win the Northern Premier League with a record points tally (100), scoring 114 goals in the process. As a result, the club were promoted to the Alliance Premier League. After a sixteenth-place finish in their first season in the league, they finished second-from-bottom in 1984–85 and were relegated back to the Northern Premier League. The club went on to win the Northern Premier League at the first attempt, earning an immediate return to the (now renamed) Football Conference. However, they lasted only one season in the Conference, and were relegated back to the Northern Premier League after finishing bottom of the table.

With the Northern Premier League having gained a second division, Gateshead became members of its Premier Division upon their return to the league. They finished eighteenth in 1987–88 and second-from-bottom the following season, but avoided relegation to Division One as no team was relegated to the league from the Football Conference. After this reprieve, the club went on to win the league in 1989–90 and were promoted back to the Football Conference. The following seven seasons saw them in mid-table every season, but after finishing in the relegation zone in 1997–98, they returned to the Northern Premier League.

After two top-five finishes following their return, Gateshead finished in mid-table in 2000–01 and 2001–02. Although they were relegated to Division One at the end of the 2002–03 season, a sixth-place finish in 2003–04 was sufficient to secure a return to the Premier Division due to the creation of the Conference North and South leading to many clubs leaving the Premier Division. A third-place finish in the Premier Division in 2007–08 saw the club qualify for the promotion play-offs, and after defeating Eastwood Town 4–0 in the semi-finals, they beat Buxton 2–0 in the final to earn promotion to the Conference North.

In the 2008–09 season, Gateshead were Conference North runners-up. In the subsequent play-offs, they defeated Southport 2–1 on aggregate in the semi-finals, before a 1–0 win over AFC Telford United in the final saw them promoted to the Conference National. The club adopted a full-time squad for the first time for the 2010–11 season. In 2013–14, the club finished third in the league, qualifying for the promotion play-offs. They defeated Grimsby Town 4–2 on aggregate in the semi-finals, setting up a Wembley final against Cambridge United, which they lost 2–1. In the following season the club reached the third round of the FA Cup for the first time; wins over Norton United in the first round and Warrington Town in the second led to a third-round tie with West Bromwich Albion, with Gateshead losing 7–0. The club were suspended from the National League in May 2019 due to financial irregularities, and were demoted to the National League North the following month.

The curtailed 2019–20 season saw Gateshead finish seventh (with the league table calculated on points-per-game), qualifying for the play-offs. However, after beating Brackley Town on penalties after a 1–1 draw in the first round, they lost 5–3 to Boston United in the semi-finals. In 2021–22 Gateshead were National League North champions, earning promotion back to the National League.

Colours and crest
The club initially played in all red strip with a white and blue vertical slash on the shirt. Gateshead continued to play in odd-coloured variations until the mid-1980s, when the club changed to the colours of the previous Gateshead incarnation – white shirt, black shorts and socks – and have played in these same colours ever since. Since 2011, Gateshead has adopted their original colours of claret and blue as the club's away strip.

The club's crest incorporates an image of the statue the Angel of the North.

Stadium
The club have played at the Gateshead International Stadium since their establishment. The record attendance of 11,750 was set in a 1995 friendly match with Newcastle United.

On 28 October 2009, Gateshead unveiled plans for a new 8,000 capacity stadium to be built in the town centre, opposite the Gateshead Civic Centre, formerly the home of North Durham Cricket & Rugby Club. However, after the failure of England's bids to host the World Cup in 2018 or 2022, the stadium, which would have acted as a training base for teams playing at nearby St James' Park, was put on hold indefinitely. In 2014, it was reported that chairman Graham Wood "no longer considers a new purpose-built football ground vital to the future of Gateshead Football Club". In December 2015, the club's new owner, Richard Bennett, announced that the club had restarted the search for a new stadium location, although he described the International Stadium as "fabulous".

Current squad

Out on loan

Non-playing staff

Managerial history

Honours
National League
National League North: Play Off Winners 2008-2009, Champions 2021–22
Northern Premier League
Premier Division champions 1982–83, 1985–86, 1989–90
Challenge Shield winners 1985–86
Durham Challenge Cup
Winners 2010–11

Records
Best FA Cup performance: Third round, 2014–15
Best FA Trophy performance: Semi-finals, 2010–11, 2017–18, 2022–23
Record attendance: 11,750 vs Newcastle United, friendly match, 7 August 1995
Biggest win: 8–0 vs Netherfield, Northern Premier League
Heaviest defeat: 9–0 vs Sutton United, Football Conference, 22 September 1990
Most appearances: James Curtis, 596 (2003–2016)
Most goals: Paul Thompson, 130 (1995–1997, 1999–2004, 2005–2008)
Record transfer fee paid: £9,000 to Dagenham & Redbridge for Paul Cavell, 1994
Record transfer fee received: £250,000 from Peterborough United for Marcus Maddison, 2014

See also
Gateshead F.C. players
Gateshead F.C. managers

References

External links

Gateshead BBC Sport

 
Football clubs in England
Football clubs in Tyne and Wear
Association football clubs established in 1977
1977 establishments in England
Sport in Gateshead
Phoenix clubs (association football)
Northern Premier League clubs
National League (English football) clubs